Anna Johnston may refer to:

 Ethna Carbery (1864–1902), born Anna Johnston, Irish journalist, writer and poet
 Anna Johnston (doctor), Australian hematologist

See also  
 Anne Johnston (disambiguation)
 Anna Johnson (disambiguation)